New Zealand cricket team in Pakistan in 2022–23 can refer to:

 New Zealand cricket team in Pakistan in 2022–23 (December 2022), New Zealand's tour to Pakistan in December 2022, part of the 2022–23 international calendar
 New Zealand cricket team in Pakistan in 2022–23 (April 2023), New Zealand's tour to Pakistan in April 2023, part of the 2022–23 international calendar